William N. Stevens (1850–1889) was a lawyer and politician who represented Sussex County, Virginia in both houses of the Virginia General Assembly. He was probably the first African-American to so serve.

Early and family life
Stevens was born free to Mary A. Stevens and her contractor husband Christopher B. Stevens in Petersburg, Virginia, as had family members for three or four generations. His family owned their own home and another lot, which they purchased in 1850 and 1858. He studied law but never married.

Career

Stevens was admitted to the Virginia state bar and moved to Sussex County, which he represented in both house of the Virginia General Assembly during much of the next two decades. He also purchased additional property in Petersburg. In 1869, Sussex County voters elected Stevens to the Virginia House of Delegates. A Republican, he was the county's sole delegate.

In 1871 voters from Sussex and adjoining Dinwiddie and Greensville Counties elected Stevens to the Senate of Virginia to replace white Republican David G. Carr. In 1874, he was joined in the Virginia Senate by Joseph P. Evans, who had been born a slave in Dinwiddie County, then won elected to the House of Delegates in 1871, and then in 1874 won an election to represent Petersburg to the Virginia Senate. However, Evans became embroiled in a conflict with Petersburg's Republican boss, former Confederate General William Mahone and lost the next election. Meanwhile, Sussex voters continued re-electing Stevens. Nonetheless, in the changing racial politics of as the century closed, Stevens lost the election of 1879 to Samuel Pickett. Stevens came back to defeat Pickett in 1881, thus again representing Sussex, Dinwiddie and Greensville Counties in the Virginia Senate, but George P. Barham defeated him in 1883. One contemporary called Stevens an "able and scholarly man" and noted his speech had "elegance and grace."

Death
Stevens died of throat cancer in 1889, at age 39 and never having married. His house in the historic African American community on Pocahontas Island (now a Petersburg neighborhood) still stands, now owned by a man dedicated to preserving the history of the island's free as well as enslaved blacks.

See also
African-American officeholders during and following the Reconstruction era

References

Bibliography

Republican Party Virginia state senators
1850 births
1889 deaths
People from Petersburg, Virginia
Virginia lawyers
Republican Party members of the Virginia House of Delegates
African-American state legislators in Virginia
19th-century American politicians
19th-century American lawyers